George Rice may refer to:

 George Rice (died 1779) (1724–1779),  Member of Parliament (MP) for Carmarthenshire
 George Rice, 3rd Baron Dynevor (1765–1852), his son, British peer and politician; also (MP) for Carmarthenshire
 George Rice-Trevor, 4th Baron Dynevor (1795–1869), his son, British peer and politician, also MP for Carmarthenshire
 George Rice (racing driver) (1914–2003), American midget race car driver
 George Rice (American football) (1944–2010), American football player
 George W. Rice (businessman) (1823–1856), American businessman known for founding the Massachusetts Mutual Life Insurance Company
 George W. Rice (photographer) (1855–1884), Arctic explorer and photographer
 George O'Hanlon (1912–1989), American comic actor, born George Rice
 George Graham Rice (1870–1943), convicted stock swindler
 George Merrick Rice (1808–1894), American businessman from Worcester, Massachusetts